Dennis Sveum is an American ice dancer. With partner Kristin Fortune, he is the 1965 & 1966 U.S. national champion. They won the silver medal at the 1966 World Figure Skating Championships.

Fortune and Sveum were coached by Jean Westwood and Charles Phillips.

Results
(with Kristin Fortune)

References

American male ice dancers
Living people
Year of birth missing (living people)
World Figure Skating Championships medalists